Stigmella bicuspidata is a moth of the family Nepticulidae. It is only known from three widely separate localities in Turkey.

Adults are on wing from July to September.

External links
The Quercus Feeding Stigmella Species Of The West Palaearctic: New Species, Key And Distribution (Lepidoptera: Nepticulidae)

Nepticulidae
Endemic fauna of Turkey
Moths described in 2003
Moths of Asia